Zhong Yongyuan is a Paralympian athlete from China competing mainly in category F42-46 shot put events.

She competed in the 2008 Summer Paralympics in Beijing, China. There she won a silver medal in the women's F42-46 shot put event.  She also finished eighth in the women's F42-46 javelin throw.

External links
 

Paralympic athletes of China
Athletes (track and field) at the 2008 Summer Paralympics
Paralympic silver medalists for China
Living people
Chinese female shot putters
Chinese female javelin throwers
Year of birth missing (living people)
Medalists at the 2008 Summer Paralympics
Paralympic medalists in athletics (track and field)
21st-century Chinese women